Chinthakommadinne (also called C.K Dinne) is a Mandal in Kadapa district of the Indian state of Andhra Pradesh. It is covers lot of villages. Postal Pin code is 516003. For list of villages covered under this mandal refer to "Revenue Division and Mandals"

References 

Villages in Kadapa district